Chestnut is a British slang term for an old joke, often as old chestnut. 
The term is also used for a piece of music in the repertoire that has grown stale or hackneyed with too much repetition. 

A plausible explanation for the term given by the Oxford English Dictionary is that it originates from a play named The Broken Sword by William Dimond, in which one character keeps repeating the same stories, one of them about a cork tree, and is interrupted each time by another character who says: Chestnut, you mean ... I have heard you tell the joke twenty-seven times and I am sure it was a chestnut.  The play was first performed in 1816, but the term did not come into widespread usage until the 1880s.

See also
old chestnut in Wiktionary

References

External links
Broken Sword text at Archive.org

Humour
Jokes